The following is a partial list of hospitals in Portland, Oregon, United States.

Private hospitals

Others

Defunct hospitals

See also
 List of hospitals in Oregon
 List of hospitals in the United States

References

Hospitals in Portland
Hospitals
Portland
Oregon, Portland